East Whiteland Township is a township in Chester County, Pennsylvania, United States. The population was 10,650 at the 2010 census.  Mailing addresses associated with East Whiteland include Malvern, Frazer, and a small area of Exton.

History
Founded in 1704, Whiteland Township was made up of what is today known as East and West Whiteland townships. The first European settlers were Welsh.  The name Whiteland came from Whitford Garden in Flintshire, Wales. Whiteland Township was divided into two townships in 1765.

Native Americans called the area "The Dark Valley" because of the numerous trees and undergrowth. During the American Revolution, Gen. George Washington and many of his troops camped at Malin Hall here. They were preparing for a September 16, 1777, encounter with British General William Howe. The Continental Army also camped near White Horse Inn on Swedesford Road. Because of bad weather, however, the "Battle of the Clouds" was never fought.

The Lapp Log House, St. Peter's Church in the Great Valley, Spring Mill Complex, and White Horse Tavern are listed on the National Register of Historic Places.

Geography

The township has a ridge of hills along its northern and southern boundaries.  These constitute the valley walls of the Great Valley, which runs generally west to east toward the Schuylkill River.  In the center of the township, there is a somewhat uneven valley floor. The Great Valley contains a number of streams, including Valley Creek and Little Valley Creek, which is a narrow stream that goes across land and woodlands.

Demographics

At the 2010 census, the township was 77.1% non-Hispanic White, 3.3% Black or African American, 0.2% Native American, 11.6% Asian, and 1.5% were two or more races. 6.9% of the population were of Hispanic or Latino ancestry.

As of the census of 2000, there were 9,333 people, 3,254 households, and 2,255 families residing in the township.  The population density was 848.6 people per square mile (327.6/km).  There were 3,460 housing units at an average density of 314.6/sq mi (121.4/km).  The racial makeup of the township was 89.57% White, 3.28% African American, 0.09% Native American, 4.98% Asian, 0.04% Pacific Islander, 0.73% from other races, and 1.31% from two or more races. Hispanic or Latino of any race were 2.42% of the population.

There were 3,254 households, out of which 34.9% had children under the age of 18 living with them, 58.3% were married couples living together, 7.7% had a female householder with no husband present, and 30.7% were non-families. 24.4% of all households were made up of individuals, and 5.8% had someone living alone who was 65 years of age or older.  The average household size was 2.59 and the average family size was 3.13.

In the township the population was spread out, with 24.0% under the age of 18, 8.5% from 18 to 24, 29.6% from 25 to 44, 23.6% from 45 to 64, and 14.3% who were 65 years of age or older.  The median age was 38 years. For every 100 females, there were 84.1 males.  For every 100 females age 18 and over, there were 79.6 males.

The median income for a household in the township was $69,500, and the median income for a family was $75,818. Males had a median income of $55,969 versus $35,507 for females. The per capita income for the township was $30,258.  About 3.9% of families and 4.7% of the population were below the poverty line, including 3.6% of those under age 18 and 6.5% of those age 65 or over.

Economy

Home to the Great Valley Corporate Center, the township also serves as U.S headquarters to several national and international firms including Siemens Health Services (formerly SMS), Vishay, SCT, Centocor and Aegon, as well as being home to numerous smaller businesses and retail shops. The Frazer Diner is a 1929 diner on U.S. Route 30 in Frazer.

Acme Markets has its headquarters in the township.

Education
The Great Valley School District serves as the public education for the township. The public schools serving the township are Kathryn D. Markley Elementary, Great Valley Middle School, and Great Valley High School. Penn State has a graduate center here, Penn State Great Valley. LeBow College of Drexel University and Immaculata University are located in the township.

Government 
Board of Supervisors

East Whiteland Township is governed by a 3-member Board of Supervisors elected at-large, who each serve 6-year terms that include executive and legislative responsibilities.  There is no mayor

Transportation

Roads and highways

U.S. Route 202 is the main highway serving East Whiteland Township. It follows a southwest-northeast alignment through the central portion of the township. U.S. Route 30 follows Lancaster Avenue along a southwest-northeast alignment through the southern portion of the township. Pennsylvania Route 29 follows Morehall Road and Charlestown Road northwest from US 30 across the northeastern portion of the township. Pennsylvania Route 352 follows Sproul Road southeast from US 30 across the southern part of the township. Finally, Pennsylvania Route 401 follows Conestoga Road northwest from US 30 through central and western portions of the township.

Public transportation
The former main line of the Pennsylvania Railroad, currently owned and operated by Amtrak and also used by SEPTA, whose Paoli/Thorndale Line regional rail service, passes through, though no stations are located in the township.

References

External links

 East Whiteland Township

Populated places established in 1704
Townships in Chester County, Pennsylvania
Townships in Pennsylvania
1704 establishments in Pennsylvania